Make Me a Supermodel is a British reality television modeling competition hosted and judged by New Zealand model Rachel Hunter, airing on the television channel Five. A U.S. version began airing 2 January 2008 on the cable network Bravo.

Series overview

Series one (2005)
The series premiered Tuesday, 14 March 2005 and followed 13 young women (including twins) competing for a modelling contract with Select Model Management and a trip to Maldives to shooting for Glamour magazine. The judges of the first season were Rachel Hunter, Tandy Anderson (co-founder and owner of Select) and fashion photographer Perou. This season contained 13 episodes.

The judges eliminated 10 contestants, with viewers voting for the winner among the final three – Kate Ellery, Alice Sinclair and Joanna Downes – in a live catwalk show presented by Tess Daly and Dave Berry. Sinclair was the first season's winner.

Contestants
(Ages stated are at start of contest)

 Antoinette Williams and Patsy Kigozi are identical twins; however, they competed individually.

Series two (2006)
The second series premiered on Sunday, 15 October 2006 with a change in format from the first series: this time, male models were part of the competition. This season contained 19 episodes and followed 12 young  competing for a modelling contract with Select Model Management and a spread in either Glamour for girls or GQ Magazine for boys. In addition, the three returning judges were joined by new judge Dylan Jones, editor-in-chief of British GQ magazine. Each week, one male contestant and one female contestant would be eliminated, until the final catwalk, at which a winner was chosen. With the exception of the first elimination, it was all based on the public's votes. The live catwalk shows were presented by Fearne Cotton on Fridays.

Each week, the bottom four contestants (two male models, two female models) would face a live 'Walk Off', and the public would vote and the male and female model who received the lowest vote total from the public would be eliminated. In the first week, there was no 'Walk Off' - the judges decided which two of the models were the weakest and should be sent home.

The final show aired on Thursday 16 November 2006. Four models competed: Albert, Jen, Luke, Marianne. As in every catwalk show in Make me a Supermodel, the models had to do 3 catwalks. After the first 'Walk Off', Marianne was eliminated. The remaining 3 models walked the next 'Walk Off' and Jen was eliminated, leaving the 2 men, Luke and Albert. After their final 'Walk Off', Albert was announced as the winner leaving Luke as runner up.

Contestants
(Ages stated are at start of contest)

Contestant elimination progress

 The model was in the bottom four in week one.
 The model was eliminated purely by the judges at the end of the first week.
 The model was in the live 'Walk Off' that week but survived the public vote.
 The model was in the live 'Walk Off' and was eliminated by the public.
 The model won the competition.

Make Me a Supermodel Extra
The behind-the-scenes show Make Me a Supermodel Extra, broadcast on the channel Five Life, was presented by Anthony Crank, and series-one contestant Jasmine Lennard, who was dropped after referring to Rachel Hunter as "Rachel Munter" live on air.

International versions
 Currently airing franchise    Franchise with an upcoming season  Franchise no longer airing

External links
Official Website (Series 1) (archive at the Wayback Machine)
Official Website (Series 2) (archive at the Wayback Machine)

References

2000s British reality television series
2005 British television series debuts
2006 British television series endings
2005 in fashion
2006 in fashion
British fashion
Channel 5 (British TV channel) reality television shows
English-language television shows
Fashion-themed reality television series
Modeling-themed reality television series
Television series by Tiger Aspect Productions
Television series by Endemol